is a Japanese manga artist, best known as the creator of sports manga Kuroko's Basketball and golf-based Robot × LaserBeam, both serialized in Weekly Shōnen Jump.

Biography
Fujimaki attended Tokyo Metropolitan Toyama High School and enrolled in Sophia University. He chose to pursue a career in manga after finishing his studies.

Notes
 On Nikkei Entertainment's list of most successful manga artist's he ranked 25th.
 Although he isn't a character of Kuroko's Basketball he ranked 15th in the first and 16th in the second character poll.
 On October 16, 2013, threatening letters were sent to Fujimaki and high schools and colleges affiliated with him. The letters carried the message "If you do not stop the parody manga, you will get hydrogen sulfide", accompanying unknown powder substances. After the arrival of many other threat letters, Fujimaki eventually stated that he will continue the manga "no matter what". On December 16, 2013, the suspect was finally arrested. Not an acquaintance of Fujimaki, he told the police that he was "jealous of [author's] success."
 According to the CHARACTERS BIBLE, Fujimaki's favourite NBA team is the Los Angeles Clippers. His all-time favourite player is Chris Paul.
 Fujimaki favours drawing a manga series about golf when he is finished with Kuroko's Basketball.
 According to him, Junpei Hyūga resembles him the most among all the characters in the series as both of them share several similar traits in personality.

References

External links
 

Living people
1982 births
Sophia University alumni
Manga artists from Tokyo